Yoram Jerzy Gross  (18 October 192621 September 2015) was a Polish-born, Australian producer of children's and family entertainment. 

He was known for his adaptation of children's characters from books and films, and best known for the production of the films Dot and the Kangaroo and Blinky Bill: The Mischievous Koala.

Early life
Gross was born in Kraków, Poland to a religious Jewish family and was the brother of the film director Natan Gross.

Gross endured World War II under the Nazi regime. His family was on Oskar Schindler's list, but chose to make their own risky escape, moving hiding places 72 times.

Gross studied music and musicology at the Jagiellonian University in Krakow (also known as Krakow University). He first entered the film industry in 1947 at the age of 20 when he became one of the first students of Jerzy Toeplitz (founder of the Polish Film Institute, the Swiss Film Institute and the Australian Film and Television School).

Early career
Gross began his career as an assistant to Polish directors Eugene Cenkalski and Leonard Buczkowski as well as the Dutch director Joris Ivens and studied script writing under Carl Foreman.

In 1950, Gross moved from Poland to Israel, where he worked as a newsreel and documentary cameraman. He then became an independent film producer and director and began winning prizes at international film festivals. 

His full-length feature, Joseph the Dreamer (1962), a biblical story, received special prizes in many countries. His experimental film Chansons Sans Paroles (1958) was heralded by some international film critics as the most interesting film of 1959. Another comedy, One Pound Only (1964), set the box office record of the year.

Australian career
In 1967, Gross, his wife Sandra and young family migrated to Australia and lived in Sydney. They established Yoram Gross Film Studio in their house, as remote workers. Gross continued to make experimental films and to win awards. He originally produced film clips for the popular weekly television music program Bandstand for such artists as John Farnham. At the Sydney Film Festival in 1970, he was awarded second prize for The Politicians in the category of best Australian-made film, and at the 1971 Australian Film Awards, his film To Nefertiti won the bronze award.

Animated films and TV series
After 1977, Gross devoted his energies to animated films and series, but maintained an interest in experimental films with awards to assist young filmmakers including the Yoram Gross Award for Best Animated Film at the Sydney Film Festival and the Yoram Gross Best Animation Award at the Flickerfest International Film Festival. Gross wrote a book on making animated films, titled The First Animated Step (1975) and produced a film of the same title.

Dot series
The first animated feature film produced by the Yoram Gross Film Studio, called Dot and the Kangaroo (1977), used a special aerial image technique of drawings over live action backgrounds. The film was based on an Australian classic best seller by Ethel Pedley, and was described by ABC film critic John Hinde as a "brilliant technical success and the best cartoon film originated in Australia". It won Best Children's Film in Tehran and also won a Sammy Award for the Best Animated Film at the 1978 Australian Film Institute Television Awards.

Gross went on to produce, direct and script a total of 16 feature films for 19 children. Eight films featuring the adventures of Dot from the original film Dot and the Kangaroo. Dot and the Bunny (1984) was the winner of the 1983 Best Animated Film at the 28th Asia Pacific Film Festival, and Dot and Keeto (1985) won the Red Ribbon Award at the 1986 American Film and Video Festival.

Coinciding with the release of the films, Gross also published books based on the films Dot and the Kangaroo, The Little Convict and Save the Lady.

Magic Riddle
Gross's 1991 animated film The Magic Riddle was based on an original story and is a mixture of fairy tales from Hans Christian Andersen, the Brothers Grimm, and others.

Blinky Bill
In 1992, Gross released Blinky Bill: The Mischievous Koala, based upon the Australian children's classic by Dorothy Wall. This film featured an Australian koala and introduced Blinky Bill to an international audience. Blinky Bill generated one of Australia's most successful merchandising programs, bringing in millions of dollars in export earnings.

In 1993, Yoram Gross Film Studio diversified into animated series for television. The first two of the Blinky Bill series, The Adventures of Blinky Bill and Blinky Bill's Extraordinary Excursion, totalled 52 half-hour episodes and achieved significant international success, particularly in Europe.

After Blinky Bill, Gross co-produced the series Tabaluga (26 half hours) with EM.TV & Merchandising AG, which became a top-rated children's show in Germany. An animated series adapting Australia's best-known kangaroo, Skippy, was completed in 1998, whereupon the studio commenced the animation of Flipper and Lopaka. Both series comprise 26 half-hour episodes.

Later career
In March 1999, EM.TV a 50% share ownership in Yoram Gross Film Studio acquired from Village Roadshow Limited to form Yoram Gross-EM.TV Pty Ltd (YGEM) was created. This new partnership marked the transition from a family business to a world brand. EM.TV and YGEM committed to the production of 10 new series over the next five years.

In the following year, the studio has been worked with the Canadian Nelvana to plan an animated adaptation of Dav Pilkey's Dumb Bunnies.

The new millennium cemented Gross and EM.TV's position as the number-one family entertainment business in the Australian country and supplier of quality children's content to the world. The studio completed a second series of both Tabaluga and Flipper and Lopaka, as well as a brand new series, Old Tom.

The Seven Network programmed a dedicated block of television produced by Yoram Gross – a fulfilment of its commitment to screen quality 'C classified' drama for children. Gross and EM.TV also launched the Junior TV channel in Germany, but shut down in many years later.

Gross's autobiography, My Animated Life was released in April 2011.

Death 
Gross died in Sydney at the age of 88 on 21 September 2015.

Honours and recognition
Gross won more than 80 international awards for his various films.

Gross was honoured in the 1995 Australia Day Honours with a Member of the Order of Australia for his services to the Australian film industry, particularly in animation techniques.

Gross celebrated his 60th anniversary in the film industry in May 2007. To celebrate the milestone, the New South Wales Film and Television Office honoured him by hosting a special retrospective screening of his career highlights, including the screening of Gross's most recent project, Autumn in Krakow, a poignant short film on his home town of Kraków, based on his late brother Nathan's poetry. In 2011, Gross was awarded the Commander's Cross with Star of the Order of Merit of the Republic of Poland and the Medal for Merit to polish Culture – "Gloria Artis"..

For users in four countries: Australia, Greece, Germany, and Israel, a Google Doodle was made for what would have been his 95th birthday to celebrate his life and works.

Filmography

Feature films

TV series
Bright Sparks (1989)
The Adventures of Blinky Bill (1993)
Blinky Bill's Extraordinary Excursion (1995)
Samuel and Nina (1996–1997)
Tabaluga (1997–2004)
Skippy: Adventures in Bushtown (1998–1999) (also known as Skippy: Adventures in Bushland)
Dumb Bunnies (1998–1999) (with Nelvana)
Flipper and Lopaka (1999–2005)
Fairy Tale Police Department (2001–2002)
Old Tom (2001–2002)
Bambaloo (2003–2004) (with The Jim Henson Company)
Art Alive (2003–2005)
Seaside Hotel (2003–2005)
Blinky Bill (2004) (also known as Blinky Bill's Extraordinary Balloon Adventure and Blinky Bill's Around the World Adventures)
Dive, Olly, Dive! (2005) (with Mike Young Productions)
Deadly (2005–2006)
Staines Down Drains (2006–2011)
Master Raindrop (2008–2009)
Legend of Enyo (2009–2010)
Zigby (2009–2013)
Zeke's Pad (2010)
Vic the Viking (2013–2014)
Tashi (2014–2015)
Heidi (2015) (final project)

Short films
 Chansons Sans Paroles (1958)
 Song Without Words (1958)
 Hava Nagila (1959)
 We Shall Never Die (1959)
 Bon Appetit (1969)
 Barry Crocker's Danny Boy (1970)
 Janice Slater's Call It What You May (1970)
 John Farnham's One (1970)
 The Politicians (1970)
 To Nefertiti (1971)
 Seasons (1972)
 Sun (1975)
 Professor Filutek (1999)
 The Naked Tree (2003)
 Autumn in Krakow (2007)
 Fuchsia Ballerinas (2007)
 Young Musicians (2007–2008)
 Don't Forget... (2010)
 Why... (2010)
 Forest Holocaust (2011)
 Sentenced To Death (2011)
 The Liar (2012)
 Kaddish (2013)

References

External links

 Web page for Flying Bark Productions
 Web page for Yoram Gross Films Pty Ltd
 

1926 births
2015 deaths
Australian animated film directors
Australian film directors
Australian film producers
Australian Jews
Australian people of Polish-Jewish descent
Australian television producers
Commanders of the Order of Merit of the Republic of Poland
Film people from Kraków
Jewish artists
Jewish film people
Members of the Order of Australia
Polish emigrants to Australia
Polish emigrants to Israel
Recipients of the Silver Medal for Merit to Culture – Gloria Artis
Blinky Bill